Vincent Coupat (born 19 February 1986) is a French orienteering competitor.

He won a bronze medal with the French relay team at the 2015 World Orienteering Championships in Inverness.

He competed at the 2016 World Orienteering Championships in Strömstad, where he placed 20th in the long distance, and also qualified for the sprint final.

References

External links

1986 births
Living people
French orienteers
Male orienteers
Foot orienteers
World Orienteering Championships medalists
21st-century French people